Hashim Djojohadikusumo is an Indonesian entrepreneur and politician.

Early life and education

Hashim was born in Jakarta, Indonesia, on 5 June 1954. From a distinguished family, he is the youngest son of Sumitro Djojohadikusumo, the architect of the economic plan for the New Order, and Dora Marie Sigar. Hashim's mother was a Protestant Christian of Minahasan descent, who originated from the Maengkom family in Langowan, North Sulawesi. His grandfather was one of the founders of Bank Negara Indonesia, Margono Djojohadikusumo. Hashim Djojohadikusumo is the younger brother of Prabowo Subianto.

Hashim studied in Europe from primary school to high school, before continuing his higher education at Pomona College, where he majored in Political Science and Economics.

Business career

In the beginning, Hashim Djojohadikusumo interned in a French investment bank as a financial analyst. He then continued his path towards the business world in becoming the director of Indo Consulting. Due to his rising development in the industry and business aspect, he then took acquisition of PT. Semen Cibinong through his company, PT. Tirta Mas. After that, he started investing his shares in Bank Niaga and Bank Kredit Asia and became a conglomerate. The Asian Financial Crisis of 1998 led to Hashim's stay in London for 9 years to be able to focus on his business. It was during that time his business progressed and spread. His successes led him back to Indonesia to save his brother's business, Kiani Kertas, that was wrapped in a Rp. 1.9 Trillion debt with Bank Mandiri. Up to this day, Prabowo's company is owned by Hashim.

The concession pushed him to expand his business to reach  of plantations, forest concessions, coal mines, and oil & gas fields ranging from Aceh to Papua. As of 2014, he was considered a billionaire. As of December 2019, Forbes estimates his net worth at $800 million, making him one of Indonesia's 50 wealthiest individuals.

Philanthropy

Hashim has devoted the past twenty years to a variety of pressing social issues in Indonesia. He is the founder of the Arsari Djojohadikusumo Foundation, which was established in honor of his late father, Professor Sumitro Djojohadikusumo, a former Indonesian economist considered the architect of the country's modern economy. The Foundation funded The Sumitro Djojohadikusumo Center for Emerging Economies in Southeast Asia (SDCEESEA) at the Center for Strategic and International Studies The SDCEESEA conducts research on U.S.-Indonesia relations and Southeast Asia. It includes a proactive program to promote deeper understanding and closer relations between the United States and Southeast Asia.

The Arsari Foundation has been collaborating with the Gadjah Mada University since 2007. In 2018 the foundation announced it would provide scholarships to students and lecturers in order to help the university advance the preservation of Javanese culture. Hashim was listed as a Hero of Philanthropy by Forbes Asia in 2011 due to his foundation's ongoing contribution to the preservation of Indonesian heritage.

Other notable achievements include: the backing of programs to save the orangutan and honey bears of Kalimantan (Borneo), and the welfare of the wild elephant population of Sumatra. He is a board member of the Institute for the Preservation of the Indonesian Heritage (“Badan Pelestarian Pusaka Indonesia”) and the Indonesian Shadow Puppeteers Association (“PEPADI”). He becomes the Chairman for Indonesian Chess Association (Percasi) in 2010. Hashim's other interests include equestrian sports, and he is a founding member of the polo association in Indonesia.

Columnist

Since early 2014, Hashim has been selected to write an occasional column for the Huffington Post.

Controversies

Hashim Djojohadikusumo has been linked to various controversies. In 2002, Hashim Djojohadikusumo was arrested after, allegedly, misusing funds for bailing out collapsed and failed banks, including Hashim's banks, in the BLBI (Liquidity Assistance of Bank of Indonesia).

Personal life
Hashim is married to Anie Hashim Djojohadikusumo, with whom he has 3 children: Aryo Puspito Setyaki Djojohadikusumo, Rahayu Saraswati Dhirakanya Djojohadikusumo, and Siti Indrawati Djojohadikusumo. Hashim is a convert to Christianity.

References

1953 births
Living people
Indonesian billionaires
Hashim
Pomona College alumni
Claremont Graduate University alumni
Indonesian Christians
Converts to Christianity from Islam
Indonesian former Muslims